The Newberry Wolves are the athletic teams that represent Newberry College, located in Newberry, South Carolina, in NCAA Division II intercollegiate sports.

The  Wolves compete as members of the South Atlantic Conference for twenty of twenty-two varsity sports; the remaining two sports, field hockey and wrestling compete in the South Atlantic Conference Carolinas.  Erskine will add Women’s Triathlon in 2021.

History
In August 2005, Newberry College was placed on a watch list by the National Collegiate Athletic Association (NCAA), along with 17 other schools, which deemed the use of "Indians" as hostile and abusive, and prohibited the use of Native American nicknames, mascots and imagery in postseason competition. In September 2005, Newberry College appealed to be removed from the list of schools which were declared unable to host postseason play on the basis that none of the institution's uses of "Indians" were hostile and/or abusive toward Native Americans. The next month, the NCAA rejected Newberry's appeal. On May 7, 2008 Newberry's Athletic Department officially retired the nickname "Indians" from all of the school's 15 NCAA athletic teams. The college used their "Block N" logo for Newberry College's athletic teams until June 7, 2010 when Newberry's Athletic Director, Brad Edwards, announced that the school had decided on a new nickname for its athletic teams. Effective from that day, Newberry College athletic teams (men's and women's) would be known as the "Wolves."

Varsity teams

List of teams

Men's sports
 Baseball
 Basketball
 Cross Country
 Football
 Golf
 Lacrosse
 Soccer
 Tennis
 Track and Field
 Wrestling

Women's sports
 Basketball
 Cross Country
 Field Hockey
 Golf
 Lacrosse
 Soccer
 Softball
 Tennis
 Track and field
 Volleyball

Individual programs

Football
Newberry's football team won their first South Atlantic Conference Championship in the 2006 season. The team finished with a 10–1 record in the regular season, losing only in their last game ever against their rival, Presbyterian College. The team also won a first-round game in their first ever post season appearance in Division II football.
Conference champions (2006, 2008, 2016, 2021, 2022)
NCAA tournament appearances(2006, 2013, 2015, 2016, 2021)

Wrestling
Begun in 2004, the Newberry College wrestling program was founded by former head coach Jason Valek, who resigned at the end of the 2015-16 season. In his twelve years as coach, Valek led the program to eight top 20 finishes at the NCAA Division II Football Championships.

References

External links